Fox River Grove (FRG) is a village in Algonquin Township, McHenry County and Cuba Township, Lake County, Illinois, United States. As per 2020 census, the population was 4,702. In 1919, the village of Fox River Grove was officially incorporated, becoming the ninth village in McHenry County. The Grove is situated along the southern shore of the Fox River. Residents refer to themselves as "Grovers."

History

Indigenous peoples

Long before the arrival of Europeans, Native Americans called the land within Fox River Grove home. The Ojibwe (also known as Chippewa) people continued to winter in the Fox River Valley into the 1860s. The women traded beadwork and purses with local settlers while the men trapped muskrat and mink, selling the pelts in nearby Barrington, Illinois. The area's proximity to Northwest Highway (Route 14), a major military and trade road, enabled such commerce to thrive. The men also made fence posts for local farmers and would "spear fish at night using torches attached to the ends of their birchbark canoes." When spring came, they traveled north to their summer lands in Wisconsin. Between 1816 and 1833, the Ojibwe and U.S. governments engaged in peace talks, resulting in several land cession treaties being signed. Eventually, the federal government took control of all Ojibwe land in Illinois. The rapid increase of European-American settlers, coupled with pressures from the government and military, eventually forced this dynamic and proud people to leave the lands that would soon become the FRG and relocate west of the Mississippi River.

Czech heritage
Pioneers built homesteads in the Fox River Valley between 1830 and 1860. They were originally drawn to the area that would become Fox River Grove for its scenery and abundance of water. Some of the first settlers to call the Grove home were Czechoslovakian immigrants who—by way of Chicago—established a Bohemian enclave along the Fox River. Attracted to the area for its prime fishing spots and access to 19th-century entertainment venues, Czechs built cottages among the village's hills and on the river's southern bank.

In 1850, ethnic-Czech, Frank Opatrny purchased  of land on the southern shore of the Fox River. Considered to be the patriarch of the village's founding family, Frank's son Eman Opatrny put FRG on the map by turning his homestead into the regionally known Picnic Grove.
 
The Czech community established St. John's Nepomucene Catholic Church and Cemetery on the southwest fringe of Fox River Grove in 1861. Named after a patron saint of Bohemia, the sanctuary's construction began in 1871 and was finished in 1874. Because of the church's small congregation, St. John's did not support a resident priest. Instead, a Chicago-based priest would visit the congregation once a year; for the rest of the year, Bohemian-speaking members of the church would conduct services. While St. John's stopped hosting worship services in 1914, the cemetery remains open to this day.

In 1900, Edward and Francis Konopasek (a Czech couple after whom one FRG's wards is named) built the Grove's first hotel—the Hotel Fox—and established a taxi service that shuttled notables like the Chicago Mayor Anton J. Cermak and Illinois Attorney General Otto Kerner Sr. from the nearest train stations to the Grove.

FRG was once also home to a Czech-styled castle replete with 100 stained glass windows. It was built by John Legat Sr. in 1920, but most of the castle is now dismantled.

Resort town period
Starting in the mid-nineteenth century, Czech immigrants transformed the Grove from a backwater pioneer settlement into a resort town. Chicagoans were attracted to the Grove's waterfront and surrounding hilly woodlands. Staying in establishments such as the Hotel Fox, Chicagoans traveled to the Grove via the Illinois & Wisconsin Railroad station and livery bus shuttle in neighboring Cary, Illinois.

Picnic Grove heyday
In 1899, Eman Opatrny bought his father Frank's homestead and converted it into picnicking grounds. Known as the Fox River Picnic Grove, this large swath of land housed picnic plots (including sheltered areas), a shooting gallery, a horse track, six bars, a boathouse, boat docks, a dancing platform, a restaurant, a photo gallery, rowboat rentals, a bowling alley, a railroad spur track, a steam-powered excursion boat, and baseball diamonds. Trainloads of pleasure-seekers would pour into the park for weekend getaways. Opatrny also built many cottages near the river's edge.

The Picnic Grove suffered a major blow in 1918 during a fire; most of the attractions from the early 1900s were lost. In 1942, Louis Jr. and Clara Cernocky purchased the Picnic Grove. The couple added more amenities, including a new dance pavilion, an air-conditioned cocktail lounge, and a 300-foot sandy beach. It fell into disarray in the 1960s. The Grove Marina, opened in 1961, was an entertainment center that included a restaurant and a cocktail lounge with live entertainment, but was destroyed by yet another fire in the mid-1970s. The Village of Fox River Grove obtained a grant to acquire  along the river in 1994, naming the property "Picnic Grove Park"; the rest of the land not purchased by the village was sold to subdivision developers.

Other resort-era establishments
Besides the Picnic Grove, FRG welcomed the addition of a luxury hotel in 1902. Christened as the Castle Pavilion and Resort Hotel, the establishment had windows displayed during Chicago's 1893 Columbian Exposition, the area's first player piano, and a dance floor. During the 1910s, the Castle Pavilion even showed motion pictures, a novelty at the time. 

In 1905, a group of ethnically-Norwegian men from Chicago established the Norge Ski Club in FRG. Utilizing its three ski jumps, the club hosts international competitions during the winter months. The Norge Ski Club is the oldest continuously open ski club in the United States. During the spring and summer, snow is substituted by plastic tarps that are laid along the jumps. In the colder months, snow machines are employed to ensure that the slopes have a continual dusting of snow. In 2018, three of its members were named to the men's U.S. Olympic ski jump team. In 2022, three of its members were named to the men's U.S. Olympic ski jump team. 

Although it no longer stands, Fox-River Grove Inn - Louie's Place was an FRG mainstay for years. Built by Louis Cernocky Sr. at the corner of Northwest Highway and Lincoln Avenue, the establishment became a watering hole for many prominent Chicago residents and several notorious gangsters. Louie's Place also housed the Crystal Ballroom, an eight-sided dance hall built in 1923 where big-bands—including Glenn Miller, Coon-Sanders, Wayne King, Louis Panico, Fred Waring, Frankie Masters, Art Kassel, and Guy Lombardo—entertained patrons. In 1921, Cernocky added a retail section to the building, and in 1922 the plot of land was subdivided and named Cernocky's Subdivision of Block 12. In 1939, a suspicious fire broke out in the ballroom. A week later, four men saturated the ballroom with kerosene while their other two counterparts abducted the night watchman and a visiting fire marshall. These strange vandals fled by car towards Barrington, as their two planted bombs detonated at the scene of the crime. On the lam, the criminals released their captives near Palatine, Illinois. Although the explosions' resulting fire gutted the ballroom, the roof and the adjoining shops survived. The ballroom was repaired, but strangely enough, it never reopened for dancers. 

In 1931, Theodore "Teddy" Bettendorf began work on what would come to be known as Castle Vianden, which is located along what is now U.S. Route 14. Being an immigrant from Vianden, Luxembourg, Teddy spent 36 years building his castle in the Luxembourgian style. By 1960, the castle, which was open to visitors, had eight towers, a guard room, bugle tower, castle yard, enclosed sun porch, modern kitchen, garage, dungeon, and a wishing well. Bettendorff continued to add to his castle until his death in 1967. During the 1970s, the castle was rented out as a honeymoon retreat. The castle remains a private residence, but recently the owners of the property have been engaged in an ongoing effort to reopen the property for public enjoyment.

In 1945, Fox River Grove established the first VFW post in McHenry County.

The Barberry Hills Ski Area—a ski hill complete with two rope tows, a vertical drop of 145 feet, and a ski shop—was established in the early 1960s. While the rope tows and shop are now defunct, the hill itself is still a destination for sledding in winter.

Gang-related activity

During the Prohibition Era, FRG embodied the metaphorical underbelly of Northwest Chicagoland's crime syndicates. From bottom-rung bootleggers to the ringleaders themselves, gangsters of all stripes staked out the Grove for both business and merry-making. Located on the Fox River, the Grove served as a smuggling hub, with its waterways providing a transportation route. At the same time, the village's small and relatively remote nature helped to shelter gang activity from the Chicago Police Department and federal authorities. Above all, however, this criminals' playground was only made possible by Louis Cernocky Sr., a local legend to this day. Cernocky's property assets throughout FRG—along with his double-life stature as both a respected citizen and Capone gang bootlegger—allowed the operation to flourish. Thanks to Cernocky, outlaws prowled the Fox River banks and frequented Cernocky's local establishments such as the Crystal Ballroom at Louie's Place—a multi-use establishment that served as a restaurant, big-band dance hall, speakeasy, and gangster hideout. Importantly, members of the Dillinger Gang and Barker-Karpis Gang were regulars. Notable gangster visitors to Louie's Place included Alvin "Creepy" Karpis, "Ma" Barker, Freddie Barker, "Baby Face" Nelson, John Dillinger, Homer Van Meter, and Tommy Carroll. The Grove was finally released from the gangsters' grasp in 1934. Having already neutralized Dillinger in Chicago, federal agents pursued and fatally shot Baby Face Nelson on nearby Route 14 in The Battle of Barrington. With most of the ringleaders dead or behind bars, the Grove's gangster era soon came to an end.

Suburban growth
During the economic prosperity of the 1990s, Fox River Grove experienced a housing boom. In 1994, 6 out of 7 of the village's trustees voted to allow a luxury housing development to be built on  within the  Picnic Grove—a stretch of land straddling the banks of the Fox River. Despite having the support of the Board of Trustees, the decision was deemed controversial by many members of the community. The housing development was built, with requirements for developers including mandatory public space creation, specified amounts of money given to the local library and school districts, and the compulsory replacement of trees chopped down in the wake of new development.

Level crossing accident

On October 25, 1995, a Metra passenger train, running express towards Chicago, collided with a Cary-Grove High School school bus, killing seven high school students. The accident brought reform and increased safety standards nationwide for signaled rail crossings located very near street and highway intersections which are regulated by traffic signals, also known as interconnected crossings.

21st century
In January 2013, a grease fire forced FRG's New China Restaurant to close. Community donations, insurance payout, and a grant allowed the restaurant to reopen in November 2014. 

In 2019, a restaurant employee dumped a quantity of cleaning fluid into the drainage system, resulting in the hospitalization of three restaurant patrons and the calling of a hazmat team to clean up the premises.

On August 21, 2019, Fox River Grove celebrated its 100th anniversary. To celebrate the centennial, the village hosted historical tours, a carnival, and a parade during the summer of 2019.

As of December 2019, FRG has become a debt-free village. According to Village President Nunamaker, this was attained through "the accumulation of operational cost savings over the past several years and fiscally responsible decision making by the village board."

Geography
It is situated on the south bank of the Fox River, which flows southwest to the Illinois River. The village of Cary is located on the north side of the river, connected to Fox River Grove by a bridge on Route 14.

Demographics

2020 census

2000 Census
As of the census of 2000, there were 4,862 people, 1,677 households, and 1,294 families residing in the village. The racial makeup of the village was 95.91% White, 0.68% African American, 0.12% Native American, 1.28% Asian, 1.13% from other races, and 0.88% from two or more races. Hispanic or Latino of any race were 3.83% of the population. Common ancestries among the population include German, Polish, Italian, Irish, and English. In 2017, nearly 9% of FRG's population was foreign-born.

There were 1,677 households, out of which 45.3% had children under the age of 18 living with them, 65.7% were married couples living together, 8.3% had a female householder with no husband present, and 22.8% were non-families. 17.7% of all households were made up of individuals, and 4.9% had someone living alone who was 65 years of age or older. The average household size was 2.90 and the average family size was 3.34.

In the village, the population was spread out, with 31.7% under the age of 18, 6.1% from 18 to 24, 35.0% from 25 to 44, 20.4% from 45 to 64, and 6.9% who were 65 years of age or older. The median age was 35 years. For every 100 females, there were 104.5 males. For every 100 females age 18 and over, there were 100.9 males.

The median income for a household in the village was $66,469, and the median income for a family was $78,847. Males had a median income of $59,306 versus $28,643 for females. The per capita income for the village was $28,870. About 5.2% of families and 7.1% of the population were below the poverty line, including 10.6% of those under age 18 and 8.6% of those age 65 or over.

In general, FRG has a highly educated populace, as 48.5% of the village's adults have at least a bachelor's degree. Moreover, over 87% of the village's workforce are employed in white-collar positions such as managers, office workers, and salespeople. The village itself has a nearly non-existent industrial sector, meaning that most of the population works outside of city limits. That being said, just over 10% of the workforce telecommutes.

Government and amenities 
The Village of Fox River Grove is classified as a non-home rule municipality. It is led by a Village President who is elected for a four-year term without term limits. The President earns an income of $500.00 a month. The current Village President is Robert J. Nunamaker.

In 1936 the FRG Library Board was established. The building's front facade is surrounded by a wall of rock slabs, erected in honor of the victims of the 1995 bus-train collision.

Education

Elementary and Middle School
The majority of children in the village are serviced by Fox River Grove School District #3. This district is made up of two schools: Algonquin Road Elementary School and Fox River Grove Middle School.

Algonquin Road Elementary School (colloquially known as ARS) provides a Kindergarten through 4th-grade educational curriculum with a 12:1 student-teacher ratio. In 2019, 52% of ARS students were deemed "proficient" in math, and only 47% tested at or above Illinois's set proficiency level in reading.

Two hundred and five students in 5th through 8th grade attended Fox River Grove Middle School (FRGMS) in 2019. 53% of FRGMS students were proficient in math in 2019, and 55% were proficient in reading. The middle school's student-to-teacher ratio was 14:1.

High schools
Most students in the village attend Cary-Grove Community High School located across the Fox River in neighboring Cary.

Parks and recreation

Over  in Fox River Grove are classified as public parks and open space. Between the village's 11 parks, access to playgrounds, basketball and volleyball courts, Port-A-Johns, sledding hills, baggo (cornhole) sets, soccer and baseball fields, picnic areas, fishing spots, hiking areas, and an ice-skating area are made available to residents and visitors.

The village's small size has inhibited it from being able to support an official park district, so recreational activities are planned and administered by the volunteer-run Fox River Grove Rec Council. Sporting opportunities offered by the Council include a men's basketball league, an adult volleyball league, and a youth soccer program. Youth baseball, softball, and basketball leagues are administered by Cary-Grove organizations.

During the annual Fireworks Celebration (always on the Saturday after the 4th of July), Fox River Grove shoots off fireworks from  Picnic Grove Park. Also in July, Picnic Grove Park serves as the "battlefield" for the Fox River Grove Fire District's water fights. 

The FRG Rec Council hosts its annual Fox Chase 5K in Stanger Park. A youth mile alternative is offered for youngsters.

Lions Park, on the Fox River, provides scenic views of Cary. This waterside park is the site of Lions Fest, a yearly September festival in which Fox River Grove residents gather to converse and eat roasted corn. The lesser-known Arts & Crafts Fair is also hosted at Lions Park each July. In 2019, the village celebrated its centennial. The highlight of this celebration was a temporary carnival installed at Lions Park.

Environmental concerns

Much of the Grove is located within the Fox River's floodplain. As a result, waterfront properties in the village are at risk of flooding. Seasonal rains in the spring and summer often wash over the backyards and parks that line the river, resulting in property damage, erosion, and the spreading of trash and pollutants from the river onto land. In order to stymie erosion in 2020, the village dumped loads of rocks along a 500-foot stretch of riverbank in Picnic Grove Park. Some residents voiced concern that this would destroy the silty bank used by children as a beach; however, it was determined that covering the beach with stone was a necessary move to make in order to preserve the shoreline.

Business

Built in 1924, King Pin Lanes became the first bowling alley to open in McHenry County.

In 1955 Roy and Glenn Weber opened Weber Fuels Service Station and the 5th Wheel Bar and Restaurant on the corner of Rt 14 and Rt 22. The property was purchased by Shell in 1987.

In 2012, the village legalized slot machines.

There are two shopping centers: Stone Hill Center and Foxmoor Crossing. The centers contain several stores (Tuesday Morning and Walgreens) and chain restaurants typical of American suburbs. Jewel-Osco serves as the Grove's premier grocery store. In 2020, a Culver's replaced Mr. Beefy's hot dog shack on Northwest Highway.

Transportation

The main artery running through Fox River Grove is U.S. Route 14, also known as Northwest Highway. Those traveling north on Route 14 can access the cities of Cary, Crystal Lake, and Woodstock; cities along Route 14 found south of the village include Barrington, Palatine, Arlington Heights, Mount Prospect, Des Plaines, Park Ridge, and Chicago. Illinois Route 22 also passes through FRG, connecting the village to North Barrington, Lake Zurich, Long Grove, Lincolnshire, the Tri-State Tollway, Bannockburn, and Highland Park. Moreover, Algonquin Road allows Grovers quick access to the villages south of FRG including Algonquin, Lake in the Hills, and Carpentersville. FRG residents can make use of the MCRide system, a dial-a-ride service that offers rides between several McHenry County municipalities.

FRG has one Metra station along the Union Pacific Northwest line which connects Harvard, Illinois to Chicago's Ogilvie Transportation Center. Non-express trips between the village Metra station and Chicago take about 70 minutes.

Sport
In 2017 Norge Ski Club ski jumpers Kevin Bickner and Casey Larson qualified for the Olympic team based on their performances in the World Cup, while Michael Glasder qualified by winning the Olympic Trial in Park City, Utah on December 31. The three jumpers from Norge Ski Club constituted 3/4 of the Men's Olympic Ski Jumping team in 2018, which made U.S. Olympic history by marking the first time three men from the same ski club represented the United States in ski jumping at the games.

References

External links
 Village of Fox River Grove

 
1919 establishments in Illinois
Chicago metropolitan area
Populated places established in 1919
Villages in Illinois
Villages in Lake County, Illinois
Villages in McHenry County, Illinois